The 1921 Virginia Orange and Blue football team was an American football team that represented the University of Virginia as a member of the South Atlantic Intercollegiate Athletic Association (SAIAA) during the 1921 college football season. Led by W. Rice Warren in his third and final season as head coach, the Orange and Blue compiled an overall record of 5–4 with a mark of 5–1 in conference play, placing third in the SAIAA.

Schedule

References

Virginia
Virginia Cavaliers football seasons
Virginia Orange and Blue football